Kubrick by Kubrick is a 2020 documentary film directed by Gregory Monro about the film director Stanley Kubrick. The film is produced by Martin Laurent, and Jeremy Zelnik under the banners of Temps noir, Telemark, and Arte. The film premiered on Arte in France on 12 May 2020.

It was scheduled to premiere at the 2020 Tribeca Film Festival, but the festival was canceled due to COVID-19, but was once again selected for the 2021 edition. Kubrick by Kubrick has been selected in numerous festivals like Karlovy Vary International Film Festival and Deauville American Film Festival. Gregory Monro's film was also awarded at the Focus international Film Festival and with a Rockie Awards at the Banff World Media Festival.

Cast

Reception 
Owen Gleiberman writing for Variety said "Everything in a Kubrick movie is delivered to you; every aspect of it is visually, logically, spatially, metaphysically built. Yet in each case what that exquisite structure contains, in its very concreteness, is a mystery. Kubrick controlled every last dimension of his movies. Except what they meant". Sheri Linden of The Hollywood Reporter wrote, "As a look at Kubrick's methods, madness and burning intelligence, Kubrick by Kubrick is fluent and discerning". Eric Kohn of IndieWire said "Kubrick by Kubrick lingers in the restless ingenuity at the heart of the filmmaker's work – a palpable desire to find new storytelling possibilities each time out".

The film won Best Arts Programming at the 49th International Emmy Awards in 2021.

References

External links 
 

2020 television films
2020 films
2020 documentary films
French documentary television films
2020s French films